The 1958 Copa del Generalísimo Juvenil was the eighth staging of the tournament. The competition began on May 18, 1958, and ended on June 29, 1958, with the final.

First round

|}

Second round

|}

Third round

|}

Quarterfinals

|}

Semifinals

|}

Final

|}

Copa del Rey Juvenil de Fútbol
Juvenil